logparser is a flexible command line utility that was initially written by Gabriele Giuseppini, a Microsoft employee, to automate tests for IIS logging. It was intended for use with the Windows operating system, and was included with the IIS 6.0 Resource Kit Tools. The default behavior of logparser works like a "data processing pipeline", by taking an SQL expression on the command line, and outputting the lines containing matches for the SQL expression.

Microsoft describes Logparser as a powerful, versatile tool that provides universal query access to text-based data such as log files, XML files and CSV files, as well as key data sources on the Windows operating system such as the Event Log, the Registry, the file system, and Active Directory. The results of the input query can be custom-formatted in text based output, or they can be persisted to more specialty targets like SQL, SYSLOG, or a chart.

Common use:
 $ logparser <options> <SQL expression>

Example: Selecting date, time and client username accessing ASPX-files, taken from all .log-files in the current directory.
 $ logparser -i:IISW3C -q "SELECT date, time, cs-username FROM *.log WHERE cs-uri-stem LIKE '%.aspx' ORDER BY date, time;"

References

External links
 Log Parser Lizard GUI for Logparser
 Log Parser Studio GUI Utility for LogParser 
  Logparser Forums - the Logparser forums
 The Microsoft logparser overview page - Archived page.
 Logparser Download
 Professor Windows - May 2005 - How Log Parser 2.2 Works by Gabriele Giuseppini
 Examples (SQL) queries for IIS Analysis
 Under the hood of Logparser by Jeff Atwood
 Visual Log Parser GUI for Logparser
 Log Parser Plus Queries/Tutorials to help you analyze logs
 Logparser.OLEDB OLEDB input format plugin

Windows security software